Chandler House may refer to:

Places

Chandler House (Stevens Creek, Arkansas), listed on the National Register of Historic Places (NRHP) in White County
Capt. Seth Chandler House, East Woodstock, Connecticut, NRHP-listed
Joseph Chandler House, Centreville, Delaware, NRHP-listed
Capt. Ebe Chandler House, Frankford, Delaware, NRHP-listed
Asa Chandler House, Elberton, Georgia, listed on the NRHP in Elbert County
Chandler-Linder House, Hartwell, Georgia, listed on the NRHP in Hart County
John Chandler House, Campbellsville, Kentucky, listed on the NRHP in Taylor County
Chandler House (Walton, Kentucky), listed on the NRHP in Boone County
Chandler-Bigsby-Abbot House, Andover, Massachusetts, NRHP-listed
Chandler-Hidden House, Andover, Massachusetts, NRHP-listed
Gen. Samuel Chandler House, Lexington, Massachusetts, NRHP-listed
Peter Chandler House, Mexico, New York, NRHP-listed
Matthew Chandler House, Sharon Center, Ohio, listed on the NRHP in Medina County
John W. Chandler House, Exmore, Virginia, NRHP-listed
Walter S. Chandler House, Waukesha, Wisconsin, listed on the NRHP in Waukesha County

Persons
Chandler House (film editor) (1904–1982), editor of Las Vegas Shakedown and other films